Roin Metreveli is a Georgian academician and historian.
He was the first elected rector of the Tbilisi State University, after Petre Melikishvili and Ivane Javakhishvili. Metreveli served as a secretary of the Central Committee of the Georgian Communist Party during the Soviet Union, from 1960 to 1972, and subsequently as its first secretary. From 1972, he was a major editor of the Georgian Encyclopedia. He is the author of more than 300 scientific publications and books about Georgian history and Caucasiology.  For several years, he was member of the Georgian Parliament. He was chairman of the board of rectors of all Georgian Universities.

Tbilisi State University 
In 1991 Roin Metreveli was appointed as Rector of Tbilisi State University. In 1992 under his leadership, Tbilisi State University regained its status as an autonomous institution, which had been lost since 1926. Once the Tbilisi State University became autonomous, the Great Scientific Council was reinstated and this council had to choose a new executive. In April 1992 a new council elected Roin Metreveli as Rector of Tbilisi State University. He was the first elected rector after Petre Melikishvili and Ivane Javakhishvili. In 1997 Professor Roin Metreveli was elected for a second term as a rector.

References 

 Tbilisi State University.

 

1939 births
20th-century historians from Georgia (country)
Educators from Georgia (country)
Members of the Parliament of Georgia
Academic staff of Tbilisi State University
Living people
Rectors of Tbilisi State University
Members of the Georgian National Academy of Sciences
21st-century historians from Georgia (country)